Balarabe is a Nigerian surname. Notable people with this name include:

 Kande Balarabe
 Sadik Balarabe
 Abubakar Balarabe
 Hadiza Sabuwa Balarabe
 Abdulkadir Balarabe Musa
 Abdullahi Balarabe Salame
 Mohammed Balarabe Haladu
 Aisha Balarabe

Surnames of Nigerian origin